The 2019 F3 Americas Championship powered by Honda was the second season for the FIA Formula 3 regional series across North America. The series is sanctioned by SCCA Pro Racing, the professional racing division of the Sports Car Club of America.

The season began on 5 April at Barber Motorsports Park as part of the Honda Indy Grand Prix of Alabama and concluded on 15 September at Sebring International Raceway after six rounds.

Teams and drivers 
All teams are American-registered.

Race calendar
All races were held on permanent road courses in the United States. The series schedule was announced on 7 December 2018.  On 21 February 2019 the series announced the addition of Road America to the schedule.  Four rounds were joint F3 Americas and United States F4 championship rounds, with events at one NTT IndyCar Series and one NASCAR Xfinity Series round each.

Championship standings

Points are awarded as follows:

Drivers' standings

Teams Championship

Notes

References

External links 
 Official website: F3 Americas Championship

F3 Americas Championship
F3 Americas Championship
Formula Regional Americas Championship
Americas F3